Pioneers is a Christian missions organization focused on church planting among unreached people groups. It was founded by former Wall Street Journal National Sales Manager Ted Fletcher in 1979 and has offices in Orlando, Florida, Australia, Ghana, Canada, New Zealand, the UK, Singapore, and Brazil. Pioneers operates in 97 countries, training and supporting 3,077 international members serving on 345 teams among 207 people groups in 154 languages.

Pioneers was originally called World Evangelical Outreach and adopted its current name in 1984. It was formed in response to Ralph D. Winter's description of the task of the church as reaching unreached ethnolinguistic people groups, and "set out to practice good missiology by contextualizing its mission and message to a postmodern missionary generation."

References

External links 

 Pioneers Website

Evangelical parachurch organizations
Christian missions
Christian missionary societies
Christian organizations established in 1979
Christianity in Orlando, Florida
Christian organizations established in the 20th century
1979 establishments in Florida